"" is the 12th single by Zard and released 6 August 1994 under B-Gram Records label. The single debuted at #1 rank first week. It charted for 12 weeks and sold over 788,000 copies.

Track list
All songs are written by Izumi Sakai, composed by Seiichiro Kuribayashi and arranged by Masao Akashi

this is last single song where Masao Akashi participated as arranger
 (original karaoke)
till 14th single, there won't be karaoke for coupling songs.

References

1994 singles
Zard songs
Songs written by Izumi Sakai
Oricon Weekly number-one singles
1994 songs
Songs written by Seiichiro Kuribayashi